Cer is a mountain in western Serbia, 30 kilometers from Šabac, 100 kilometers west of Belgrade. Cer is rich in the Turkey oak forests after which it was named.

History

During World War I, the Battle of Cer was fought on Cer, in which Serbian forces defeated Austria-Hungary.

References

Mountains of Serbia